Józef Mackiewicz (April 1, 1902 – January 31, 1985) was a Polish writer, novelist and political commentator; best known for his documentary novels Nie trzeba głośno mówić (One Is Not Supposed to Speak Aloud), and Droga donikąd (The Road to Nowhere).

See also

 Polish literature
 Polish literature during World War II
 Ferdynand Goetel, writer blacklisted in communist Poland for participating in the original delegation to Katyn, regarding mass graves of Polish soldiers killed by Soviet NKVD in the 1940 Katyn massacre
 Website dedicated Jozef Mackiewicz

References

 The historical interview by Jozef Mackiewicz with the journal "Goniec Codzienny" ("Daily Herald") from 3rd of June 1943 about his visit to Katyń – English translation from Mackiewicz, "Katyń - zbrodnia bez sądu i kary" (Katyn - a crime without trial nor punishment), edited by Jacek Trznadel, ANTYK Marcin Dybowski Publishing, Warsaw 1997.
 Website dedicated Jozef Mackiewicz

1902 births
1985 deaths
Polish nobility
Polish Roman Catholics
Polish political writers
Polish male novelists
Polish anti-communists
Polish conservatives
Commanders of the Order of Polonia Restituta
20th-century Polish novelists
20th-century Polish journalists
Writers from Vilnius
People associated with the magazine "Kultura"